S. brasiliensis may refer to:
 Salminus brasiliensis, the golden dorado, a large river fish species found in South America
 Scomberomorus brasiliensis, the Serra Spanish mackerel, a fish species found in the Atlantic
 Scutiger brasiliensis, a fungus species in the genus Scutiger
 Senecio brasiliensis, the flor-das-almas, a perennial plant species native to the fields and meadows of central South America
 Sinningia brasiliensis, a flowering plant in the genus Sinningia
 Sphenodiscus brasiliensis, an extinct ammonite species with fossils found along the banks of the Rio Gramame in Brazil
 Sylvilagus brasiliensis, the Tapeti, Brazilian rabbit or forest rabbit, a cottontail rabbit species found in Central and South America

Synonyms
 Scymnus brasiliensis, a synonym for Isistius brasiliensis, the cookiecutter shark, a shark species

See also